Kyrgyzstan competed at the 2020 Summer Paralympics in Tokyo, Japan, from 24 August to 5 September 2021.

Competitors
The following is the list of number of competitors participating in the Games:

Athletics

Men's Field

Judo

See also 
Kyrgyzstan at the 2020 Summer Olympics

References 

Nations at the 2020 Summer Paralympics
2020
2021 in Kyrgyzstani sport